The list of ship launches in 1705 includes a chronological list of some ships launched in 1705.


References

1705
Ship launches